McGriff's House Party is an album by organist Jimmy McGriff recorded in 1999 and released on the Milestone label the following year.

Reception 

Allmusic's Al Campbell said: "McGriff's House Party took two days to complete and found the participants in a hard funk mood. ... another enjoyable and recommended soul groove session". Douglas Payne noted "McGriff seems ready to leave the lounge and get back to the soul and funk of the chittlin circuit. ... A nice comeback for one of the funkiest organists, when he wants to be". In JazzTimes, Owen Cordle wrote "The Philadelphia organist knows how to initiate an infectious rhythmic feeling and keep it happening via hip footwork and judicious keyboard jabs ... All told, this house party, one of the organist’s best, is worth revisiting often".

Track listing
All compositions by Rodney Jones except where noted
 "Neckbones a la Carte" – 8:04
 "Blues for Stitt" (Bill Easley) – 8:21
 "Red Roses for a Blue Lady" (Sid Tepper, Roy C. Bennett) – 5:48
 "Red Cadillac Boogaloo" (George Benson) – 6:02
 "That's All" (Alan Brandt, Bob Haymes) – 6:33
 "McGriff's House Party" – 7:29
 "Grits, Gravy and Groove" – 7:33
 "Dishin' the Dirt" (Lonnie Smith) – 10:02

Personnel
Jimmy McGriff – Hammond X-B3 organ
Kenny Rampton – trumpet (tracks: 4–6,8)
Eric Alexander, Bill Easley (tracks: 1–3,7) – tenor saxophones
Dr. Lonnie Smith – organ (tracks: 4–6,8)
Rodney Jones – guitar
Bernard Purdie − drums

References

Milestone Records albums
Jimmy McGriff albums
2000 albums
Albums produced by Bob Porter (record producer)
Albums recorded at Van Gelder Studio